Arturo Cucciolla (21 January 1948 – 19 August 2021) was an Italian architect. He designed buildings in Bari, and he authored several books.

Works
 A. Cucciolla, Bari: questione urbana e piano regolatore, s.e., Bari, 1977.
 D. Borri- A. Cucciolla- D. Morelli, Questione urbana e sviluppo edilizio. Il caso di Bari, Dedalo, Bari, 1980.
 A. Cucciolla, La formazione del Bauhaus. Architettura in Germania tra 800 e 900, Edipuglia, Bari, 1984.
 A. Cucciolla, Bauhaus: lo spazio dell'architettura, Edipuglia, Bari, 1984.
 A. Cucciolla, Urbanistica: verso il governo della complessità. La città fra espansione e riuso, s.e., Bari, 1988.
 A. Cucciolla, La città vecchia di Bari. Un problema di recupero e riuso, s.e., Bari, 1994.
 A. Cucciolla-M. Di Marzo-F.Zezza, Recupero delle mura di S.Scolastica nella città vecchia di Bari, s.e., Bari 2003.
 A. Cucciolla, Vecchie città-città nuove: Concezio Petrucci 1926-1946, Dedalo, Bari, 2006.

References

1948 births
2021 deaths
People from Bari
20th-century Italian architects
21st-century Italian architects